A Viking Saga is a 2008 film about the early life and rise to power of Oleg of Novgorod, the Rus prince who attacked and conquered Kiev in AD 882 from the Rus war-lords Askold and Dir, before moving his capital there.

Cast
 Ken Vedsegaard as Oleg of Novgorod
 Peter Gantzler as Askold
 Erik Holmey as Rurik
 Kim Sønderholm as Dir
 Ida Marie Nielsen as young Lena

See also
 List of historical drama films

External links
 

2008 films
Danish historical drama films
Films based on European myths and legends
Films set in Russia
Films set in the Viking Age
Films set in the Middle Ages